Francisca Rico Martínez (13 October 1929 – 9 July 2017), better known as Paquita Rico, was a Spanish film actress and singer. She appeared in 30 films between 1948 and 1983. She starred in the film Let's Make the Impossible!, which was entered into the 8th Berlin International Film Festival.

She died from natural causes on 9 July 2017 at the age of 87.

Selected filmography

References

External links

1929 births
2017 deaths
Spanish film actresses
People from Seville
20th-century Spanish actresses